Bordean is a hamlet in the East Hampshire district of Hampshire, England. It is in the civil parish of East Meon. It is 1 mile (1.6 km) northwest of the village of Langrish and 3.5 miles (5.6 km) west of Petersfield, on the A272 road.

The nearest railway station is Petersfield, 3.2 miles (5.2 km) east of the hamlet.

References

Villages in Hampshire